States of Undress is a show on Viceland television hosted by actress and model Hailey Gates, exploring the fashion scenes in various countries, at the same time offering an insight into the culture, history and politics of the country.

Episodes

See also
 List of programs broadcast by Viceland

References

External links
 

2010s American documentary television series
2016 American television series debuts
Viceland original programming